Shanghai East Hospital is a general hospital in Pudong, Shanghai, China. It is a teaching hospital affiliated to Tongji University.

Facilities
The Shanghai East (Oriental) Hospital, affiliated to Shanghai Tongji University School of Medicine was founded 1920. Two campuses exist in Shanghai. The main campus ('Northern Division') is located in Lujiazui, Pudong, 150 Jimo Road and the South-Campus ('Southern Division') is located in Pudong, 1800 Yuntai Road.
Both locations include 61 clinical and technical departments and offices. The hospital includes 2000 in-patient beds total.
The hospitals fields of work include medical procedures, disease prevention, medical education and medical research. 
Both campuses employed 2800 staff members in 2019, including about 400 attending medical doctors.
The hospital annually serves more than 3 million walk-in and emergency patients, amongst them are 40000 international patients.
The hospital has a 64-row spiral CT machine, Flash CT, PET-CT, 3.0 T MRI, DSA, or EDGE Radiosurgery Systems available within the radiology department. The surgical departments offer Hybrid Operation Rooms, circulatory-assist devices, LINAC, ECT and real-time 3D color ultrasound.

Key disciplines 
Disaster medicine
Heart failure therapy
Cardiac surgery
Cardiovascular medicine
Dental implantation and prosthodontics
Minimal invasive gallstone surgery
Oncology treatment
Cerebral-vessel disease treatment
Anorectal surgery
Cranial tumor surgery

Notable professors
Dr. Barry J. Marshall, Nobel Prize Winner 2005, Director of the Marhall International Diagnosis and Treatment Centre for Digestive Diseases

Education and training
The Shanghai East Hospitals Education Office is responsible for the domestic education of the undergraduate, postgraduate and doctoral students of Shanghai Tongji University School of Medicine. The medical students are educated by 96 doctoral tutors and 140 master tutors. 
In 2010, the hospital has established an 'International Clinical Elective Program' in cooperation with German physicians and MedoPolo International Medical Elective Programs. The hospital currently offers the largest international medical student elective program within mainland China and receives roughly 80 - 100 students from all countries annually.

Scientific research platforms
Laboratory of Arrhythmia of Ministry of Education
Translational Medicine Center for Stem Cell Research of Zhangjiang
National Stem Cell Bank
Shanghai Heart Failure Institute
Shanghai Municipal Stroke Center

Rankings
Comprehensive Disease Treatment Index in Shanghai: Number 8 (2016)
Science and Technology Impact in China: Number 68 (2016)
Nature Index: Number 8 (2017)
National Natural Science Foundation of China: Number 20 (2017)

Foreign cooperations
Sino-German Heart Research Institute, cooperating with the German Heart Center in Berlin (DHZB) (2001). 
Sino-American International Hospital
Sino- Japanese Senmao Clinic
Sino-French Urological Surgery Center
Sino-American East-Anderson Tumor Center
Sino-American Emergency Research Institute

See also
Introduction to Shanghai East Hospital
Official website of the Shanghai East Hospital

References

Teaching hospitals in Shanghai
Tongji University
Pudong